This is a list of hospitals in Guyana. The following hospitals are located in Guyana:

Defunct Hospitals 

 Mahaica Hospital, Mahaica. A leprosy hospital established in British Guiana. Upon closure, services moved to The Palms, a geriatric home.
 The planned construction of the Speciality Hospital at Liliendaal, East Coast Demerara was cancelled in 2017.

References

External links 

 Ministry of Health Guyana (By region: 1, 2, 3, 4, 5, 6, 7, 8, 9, 10, and Georgetown)

List
Guyana
Hospitals
Guyana